Nabil Aankour (born 9 August 1993) is a Moroccan professional footballer who plays as a midfielder.

References

External links 
 
 

Living people
1993 births
Association football midfielders
Moroccan footballers
Moroccan expatriate footballers
Korona Kielce players
Arka Gdynia players
MC Oujda players
Al-Nahda Club (Saudi Arabia) players
Ekstraklasa players
Botola players
Saudi First Division League players
Expatriate footballers in France
Moroccan expatriate sportspeople in France
Expatriate footballers in Poland
Moroccan expatriate sportspeople in Poland
Expatriate footballers in Saudi Arabia
Moroccan expatriate sportspeople in Saudi Arabia
21st-century Moroccan people